The Tauranga by-election of 1923 was a by-election during the 21st New Zealand Parliament in the  electorate. The seat became vacant due to the death of the sitting Member, William Herries. The election was held on 28 March 1923 and won by Charles MacMillan, who defeated the former prime minister Joseph Ward.

Background
Two candidates contested the seat. The first was Charles MacMillan, a former Mayor of Tauranga (1915–1917. MacMillan represented the Reform Party and was put forward by the party to succeed Herries. The other candidate was Sir Joseph Ward, a former Liberal party Prime Minister.

The Labour Party took a keen interest in the by-election. Leader Harry Holland was fearful that Ward's return to Parliament might result in a revival of the Liberals, delaying Labour's rise as the main left-wing party. As a result, he sought to stand a candidate to split the anti-Reform vote. He was overruled however, by the party executive citing the lack of any established branches within the electorate and the possibility of a poor showing by the candidate damaging party morale and credibility.

Result
MacMillan won the by-election; Ward's defeat was humiliating to him.

He retired in 1930, and died soon after.

Notes

References

Tauranga 1923
1923 elections in New Zealand
Politics of the Bay of Plenty Region
Tauranga